William Nichol may refer to:

William Nichol (cricketer) (1912–1973), Scottish cricketer
William E. Nichol (1918–2006), American politician in Nebraska
William Nichol (mayor) (1800–1878), American banker and mayor of Nashville, Tennessee

See also
Wilfred Nichol (1901–1955), British athlete sometimes referred to mistakenly as William Nichol
William Nicholl (1868–1922), rugby union footballer of the 1890s
William Nicoll (disambiguation)